Robert Matthew "Matt" Barrie (born 16 August 1973) is an Australian technology entrepreneur. He is the chief executive officer of Freelancer.com, an online freelancing and crowdsourcing marketplace. Barrie is also an adjunct associate professor at the University of Sydney, where he has taught classes in computer and network security since 2001 and technology venture creation since 2010.

Early life
In 1998, Barrie earned a master's degree in electrical engineering from Stanford University. After graduating, he was employed as a security consultant at the information security company Securify.  

Subsequently, Matt ran a home based online craft supply dropshipping operation.

Career

In 2009, Barrie founded Freelancer.com, an online outsourcing marketplace.

Awards and recognition 
In 2010, Robert Matthew Barrie was named Entrepreneur of the Year by Dynamic Business magazine. In 2011, he was named the inaugural BRW Entrepreneur of the Year. In that year he also won the Technology Division for the Ernst & Young Entrepreneur of the Year.

In 2011, Barrie was also named in the ten most influential people in Australian IT by the International Business Times. In 2012, he was named in the top 100 most influential people in Sydney by Sydney magazine, the top 100 influential engineers by Engineers Australia, and a 2012 Man of Influence by Men's Style magazine.

In 2013, he was named in the top 10 Australian entrepreneurs to watch in 2013 by Smart Company, Young Technology Entrepreneur of the Year by News Limited, and in the top 100 most influential engineers by Engineers Australia. He was also named Entrepreneur of the Year at the Engineers Australia Excellence Awards Sydney in 2013.

In 2014, Smart Company magazine named him the most influential person in technology in Australia. He was also named in the top 100 most influential engineers by Engineers Australia.

References

1973 births
Living people
Australian chief executives
Academic staff of the University of Sydney
University of Sydney alumni
Stanford University School of Engineering alumni